Snowdrop is a standing female nude in plaster, sculpted by Per Hasselberg in 1881. It is named after the snowdrop flower at the woman's feet, although the title also refers to its young, innocent subject stepping out of childhood and into womanhood - Hasselberg used a sixteen-year-old Italian girl as a model for the work

Exhibited at the 1881 Paris Salon, it was the only Swedish work of art to receive an honorable mention, leading to Hasselberg's definitive breakthrough as an artist. The Nationalmuseum in Sweden commissioned a copy in marble in 1883 at the cost of 6,000 kroner - this was awarded a gold medal at the 1883 Salon.

The work became very popular in both public and private contexts, leading to high demand for replicas and full-size and smaller reproductions. It was cast in bronze for Stockholm's Mariatorget, the city's first non-honorific public statue - it was funded by director CR Lamm at Ludvigsberg and inaugurated in November 1900.

Selected copy
 Plaster originals (162 cm): Ronneby town-hall (1881), Waldemarsudde (inköpt 1943) and private collection
 Marble originals : Nationalmuseum, Stockholm (1883), Göteborgs konstmuseum (1885), Glyptoteket, Copenhagen (1887-1889) and the Österslättsskolan, Karlshamn (1890). 
 Bronze casts:
 1900, Meyer's Foundry (Mariatorget, Stockholm)
 1910, Nordic Company workshops, Nyköping, Falun
 1917, Meyer's Foundry, Ronneby Square
 1953, C & A Nicci, Rome for Rottneros Park
 Miniature versions, Parian marble - 1700 (50 cm high) were produced 1888-1926 and 625 (60 cm high) 1887-1926, both at the Gustavberg porcelain factory.
 Statue in Skottorps slottspark.

References

Bibliography
 
 
 Flemming Friborg: "Europæisk skulptur", Ny Carlsberg Glyptotek 1997, s. 108-109.
 Hvar 8 dag : illustreradt magasin, Andra årgången (1 oktober 1900 - 29 september 1901), D F Bonnier, Göteborg 1901, s. 112.
 Nationalencyklopedin, Band 8, 1992, s. 428.
 Göran Söderlund och Christina Wistman (katalogredaktörer), Lars Engelhardt, Per Myrehed, Sven Nilsson, C.G. Rosenberg och Erik Cornelius (foto):"Svenska klassiker - Från historiemåleri och romantik till sekelskiftets stämningsmåleri 1860-1910", Prins Eugens Waldemarsudde, Utställningskatalog nr 59:01, s. 146.
 Lennart Wærn: "In memoriam Coco et Coco redivivus - Studier kring ett "förlorat" och "återfunnet" hasselbergverk" i "Det skapande jaget", Konstvetenskapliga institutionen, Göteborgs universitet 1996, s. 130 och 132.

External links 
 Susanna Björklöf and others: Inventering av Rottneros park : Historisk utveckling och kulturvärden, Länsstyrelsen i Värmlands län, 2007, sid 85.
 Figuriner och statyetter. Gustavsberg & Rörstrand.
 Karlshamns museum  
 skulptur.stockholm.se
 Om Snöklockan på goteborg.se

1881 sculptures
Nude sculptures
Sculptures in Sweden
Sculptures of the Ny Carlsberg Glyptotek
Collections of the Gothenburg Museum of Art
Collections of the Nationalmuseum Stockholm
Marble sculptures
Plaster sculptures
Bronze sculptures in Sweden
Outdoor sculptures in Sweden
Sculptures of women in Sweden
Sculptures by Swedish sculptors